Durian is a large odorous spike-covered fruit of several southeast Asian tree species belonging to the genus Durio.

Durian may refer to:

Durian Durian, 2000 Hong Kong film directed by Fruit Chan
Durian Tunggal, small town in Melaka state Malaysia
Ohan Durian (1922–2011), Armenian conductor
The Big Durian (disambiguation)
Typhoon Durian, intense storm that wreaked havoc in the Philippines in 2006
Sintel (code named "Project Durian"), a 2010 open content short film by the Blender Foundation